David Livingstone is a 1936 British historical adventure film directed by James A. FitzPatrick and starring Percy Marmont, Marian Spencer and James Carew. It portrays the expedition of the British explorer David Livingstone to Africa to discover the source of the Nile, his disappearance, and the expedition to find him led by Stanley. The film was made at Shepperton Studios for distribution by MGM.

Main cast
 Percy Marmont as David Livingstone 
 Marian Spencer as Mary Moffatt 
 James Carew as Gordon Bennett 
 Pamela Stanley as Queen Victoria 
 Hugh McDermott as H.M. Stanley

References

Bibliography
 Harper, Sue. Picturing the Past: The Rise and Fall of the British Costume Film. British Film Institute, 1994.
 Low, Rachael. Filmmaking in 1930s Britain. George Allen & Unwin, 1985.
 Wood, Linda. British Films, 1927-1939. British Film Institute, 1986.

External links
 

1936 films
British historical adventure films
1930s historical adventure films
Films set in the 19th century
Films directed by James A. FitzPatrick
Films set in England
Films set in Africa
Films shot at Shepperton Studios
Cultural depictions of David Livingstone
Cultural depictions of Henry Morton Stanley
Cultural depictions of Queen Victoria on film
British black-and-white films
1930s English-language films
1930s British films